Najlepši hitovi! Uživo! (Prettiest hits! Live!) is the first live and only live album by the Serbian alternative rock band Disciplina Kičme, released by the Serbian record label PGP RTB in 1987.

Track listing 
All music and lyrics by Zeleni Zub, except track 7, written by Yu Grupa, and track 9, written by Neal Hefti.

Personnel

The band 
 Koja (Dušan Kojić) — bass, vocals
 Kele (Nenad Krasavac) — drums, vocals, mixed by
 Dedža — trumpet
 Zerkman (Zoran Erkman) — trumpet

Additional personnel 
 Branko Potkonjak — engineer, mixed by 
 Zeleni Zub (Dušan Kojić) — written by (tracks 1 to 6), artwork by [cover]

References 
 EX YU ROCK enciklopedija 1960-2006, Janjatović Petar; 
 Najlepši hitovi! Uživo! at Discogs

1987 live albums
Serbian-language live albums
Live alternative rock albums
Disciplina Kičme albums
PGP-RTB live albums